Ushuaia may refer to the following:

Ushuaia, a city in Tierra Del Fuego, Argentina, which is considered the southernmost city in the world.
Ushuaia Department, an administrative division
Ushuaia River
Ushuaia International Airport
Colegio Nacional de Ushuaia, National School of Ushuaia.
Ushuaia en Rojo, a song about Ushuaia by Vodevil
Ushuaia (beauty products series); a series of beauty products made by LaSCAD
Ushuaïa Ibiza Beach Hotel (hotel); a hotel on Playa D'en Bossa in Ibiza known for its electronic music parties
Title of a French TV series and Ushuaïa Foundation, which was renamed Fondation Nicolas Hulot pour la Nature et l'Homme
, a Panamanian-flagged cruise ship
Ushuaia (K3 album), 2016 album by Belgian band K3